Chen Yung-fa (born 1 September 1944) is a Chinese historian from Taiwan.

Chen was born in Chengdu, Sichuan province. He moved with his family to Taiwan in 1949. After Chen earned bachelor's and master's degrees from National Taiwan University, he completed a doctorate in history at Stanford University, and became a professor at National Taiwan University. He was elected to the Academia Sinica in 2004 and served as the director of the academy's  between 2002 and 2009. He has been sought for commentary regarding the history of the Republic of China. Beginning in 2011, Chen led a project to digitalize the diarial writings of Tan Yankai.

Selected publications

References

1944 births
Living people
20th-century Chinese historians
Historians of China
Stanford University alumni
Academic staff of the National Taiwan University
Members of Academia Sinica
21st-century Chinese historians
National Taiwan University alumni
20th-century Taiwanese historians
21st-century Taiwanese historians